In signal processing, the Kautz filter, named after William H. Kautz, is a fixed-pole traversal filter, published in 1954.

Like Laguerre filters, Kautz filters can be implemented using a cascade of all-pass filters, with a one-pole lowpass filter at each tap between the all-pass sections.

Orthogonal set 

Given a set of real poles , the Laplace transform of the Kautz orthonormal basis is defined as the product of a one-pole lowpass factor with an increasing-order allpass factor:

.

In the time domain, this is equivalent to

,

where ani are the coefficients of the partial fraction expansion as,

For discrete-time Kautz filters, the same formulas are used, with z in place of s.

Relation to Laguerre polynomials 

If all poles coincide at s = -a, then Kautz series can be written as, 
,
where Lk denotes Laguerre polynomials.

See also 
 Kautz code

References 

Linear filters